Old Saint Paul's is an historic church of the Scottish Episcopal Church in the heart of Edinburgh's Old Town in Scotland. It is one of the original congregations of the Scottish Episcopal Church, part of the Anglican Communion, which evolved with the adoption of Presbyterian governance by the established Church of Scotland.

Its congregation originally formed a breakaway group from the city's Saint Giles' Cathedral.

History 
Although the present building dates from the 19th century, Old Saint Paul's has a history going back 300 years to the beginning of the Scottish Episcopal Church.

The original congregation of Old Saint Paul's was a breakaway group from Saint Giles' Cathedral, which had become the Cathedral of Edinburgh in 1634. The last bishop at Saint Giles', Alexander Rose, left the Cathedral in 1689 accompanied by much of his congregation.  He founded a new place of worship in an old wool store in Carrubber's Close – this lies close to the present site of Old Saint Paul's.

Many Episcopalians remained pro-Jacobite during the Jacobite rising of 1689, loyal to James and his descendants. Members of Saint Paul's were involved in the Jacobite struggle, including the Risings of 1715 and 1745. One member of the congregation brought the news of Bonnie Prince Charlie's victory at Prestonpans to Edinburgh, shutting the town gates against the defeated Hanoverian army.

As a result of the Risings, Episcopalians and their places of worship were persecuted under law. It was only after the death of Charles Edward Stuart (Bonnie Prince Charlie) in 1788 that the association of Episcopalians with Jacobitism was shaken off. Penal laws were gradually repealed, and in that year the Scottish Synod resolved that George III would be prayed for in all Episcopal Churches.

Building 
The present building was designed by Hay and Henderson in the Early English style at a cost of £3500, and was completed in 1883. Hay had been a pupil of Sir Gilbert Scott (architect of Saint Mary's Episcopal Cathedral in the West End of Edinburgh). Two subsequent nave extensions have trebled the building's original length, and the chancel floor has been raised and laid with marble.

The high altar is made of carved oak in neo-Norman style with grape vine decoration, surmounted with a slab of porphyry. Seven lamps represent the gifts of the Holy Spirit. The reredos is in gilded oak, and was designed by Hay & Henderson in 1896. The lancet windows depict the crucifixion, with Saint Paul and Saint Columba on either side. The roof of the nave is a hammer beam structure with wooden gargoyles. The pulpit is made of carved oak, with figures of saints, and was built in 1892.

A memorial chapel (warriors Chapel) was built in 1926 as a memorial to the lives lost in the First World War, designed by Sir Matthew Ochterlony. This was organised by the then Rector, Canon Albert Ernest Laurie (1866–1937). It contains rolls of honour from both World Wars. This chapel also contains the Martyrs' Cross, a small iron cross that originally hung in the Grassmarket opposite the gallows, and was the last object seen by condemned criminals before execution. The chapel ordinarily houses a painting by Alison Watt, a Scottish artist.

Sculpture 

At the head of the Calvary Stair is a sculpture of the Crucifixion by Alfred Frank Hardiman completed in 1926.

The Organ 
The present organ was built by Father Henry Willis and installed in 1888. Slight modifications were made to this instrument in 1936; it was electrified and enlarged in 1960 when a new console with tab stops was provided. Further tonal modifications and additions were made in 1968.

The Church Hall 
Beneath the Church is a sizeable hall. During the Edinburgh Fringe, the hall is transformed into theSpace @ Venue 45 by venue operators theSpaceUK.

References

External links

 Old Saint Paul's
 theSpace @ Venue 45

Anglo-Catholic church buildings in Scotland
Christianity in Edinburgh
Episcopal church buildings in Edinburgh
Listed churches in Edinburgh
Category B listed buildings in Edinburgh
Old Town, Edinburgh